Pitkyarantsky District is an administrative district (raion), one of the fifteen in the Republic of Karelia, Russia. It is located in the southwest of the republic. Its administrative center is the town of Pitkyaranta. As of the 2010 Census, the total population of the district was 19,895, with the population of Pitkyaranta accounting for 57.4% of that number.

Administrative and municipal status
Within the framework of administrative divisions, Pitkyarantsky District is one of the fifteen in the Republic of Karelia and has administrative jurisdiction over one town (Pitkyaranta) and thirty-five rural localities. As a municipal division, the district is incorporated as Pitkyarantsky Municipal District. The town of Pitkyaranta and three rural localities are incorporated into an urban settlement, while the remaining thirty-two rural localities are incorporated into four rural settlements within the municipal district. The town of Pitkyaranta serves as the administrative center of both the administrative and municipal district.

Sights
The Cross of Sorrow, a memorial to soldiers perished on both sides of the Winter War of 1939–1940, is located in Pitkyarantsky District at the crossroads of Pitkyaranta–Suoyarvi–Petrozavodsk.

References

Notes

Sources

Districts of the Republic of Karelia